Tanunda is a town situated in the Barossa Valley region of South Australia, 70 kilometres north-east of the state capital, Adelaide. The town derives its name from an Aboriginal word meaning water hole. The town's population is approximately 4600. The postcode is 5352

Settlement
Prussian immigrants who arrived with Pastor Gotthard Fritzsche founded the village of Bethanien in 1842, the first settlement in the vicinity of today's Tanunda.  One year later,  Prussians relocating from Klemzig on the Torrens River, where they had settled upon immigrating in 1838 with Pastor August Kavel, came to the Barossa Valley and founded the village of Langmeil.  Their new community bore the name of a Prussian town near Zullichau, from where the settlers had originated; it is now a Polish village known as Okunin.  Sometime later, another village was founded and named Tanunda.  Due to anti-German sentiments, both Langmeil and Bethanien were renamed during the Great War to Bilyara and Bethany respectively, although Bilyara reverted to Langmeil in 1975.  As development of the Tanunda area continued, the villages of Langmeil and Tanunda were joined. Today the township is simply called Tanunda.

Industry

Tanunda and the Barossa Valley comprise one of Australia's premier wine-growing areas, and the town is surrounded by vineyards. One such vineyard, Turkey Flat, is home to Shiraz vines that were planted in 1847 and are believed to be the world's oldest continually producing commercial vineyard that has been authenticated.

Culture
The German heritage of Tanunda is still present today. The town has a male choir the Tanunda Liedertafel, the history of which is thought to date back to 1850. There is also a Kegel (bowling) club. The Tanunda Town Band celebrated 150 years as a band in 2007 and is the oldest brass band in the Southern Hemisphere. Tanunda served as the launching point for the Nazi party’s effort to expand in Australia in the 1930s.

Media 
Historically, Tanunda (and Adelaide) was the home to a number of the earliest South Australian newspapers that were printed primarily in German. German newspapers were set up by early settlers, but many were forced to close or merge due to labour shortages caused by the Victorian gold rush of the 1850s-1860s.
 Deutsche Zeitung für Süd-Australien (1851)
 Süd Australische Zeitung (1860–1874) - Tanunda/Adelaide
 Australisches Unterhaltungsblatt (1862-1916) - a supplement to the Süd Australische Zeitung and Australische Zeitung
 Tanunda Deutsche Zeitung (1863-1869) - later renamed Australische Deutsche Zeitung
 Australische Deutsche Zeitung (1870-1874) - Tanunda/Adelaide: a Melbourne edition of the newspaper was also printed 1870–1872.
 Australische Zeitung (1875–1916) - Tanunda/Adelaide: formed by the merger of Süd Australische Zeitung, and Australische Deutsche Zeitung; closed due to WWI
 Australische Zeitung (1927-1929) - attempted revival

Two weekly English-language newspapers served the area:
The Leader, has been operating in the area since 1918.
 The Barossa and Light Herald from 1951, though its antecedents date from 1860.

See also 

 Adelaide Liedertafel
 Barossa Valley
 Barossa Deutsch

References 

Towns in South Australia
Barossa Valley